Siegfried Ludwig (14 February 1926, Vlasatice, Czechoslovakia – 16 April 2013, St. Pölten, Austria) was an Austrian politician and Governor of Lower Austria from 1981 to 1992.

See also
List of governors of Lower Austria

References

1926 births
2013 deaths
Governors of Lower Austria (after 1918)